Chicago, Detroit, Redruth is the fourth studio album by Luke Vibert under his own name, released in 2007 on Planet Mu.

Critical reception
Tim DiGravina of AllMusic gave the album 4 stars out of 5, commenting that "As the title suggests, things are a bit more old-school, at least on parts of this outing, with more tracks than usual foregoing Vibert's trademark wacky voice samples, though the anime and educational film voices are still at the heart of some of the songs." Nate Dorr of PopMatters gave the album 6 stars out of 10 and said, "Indeed, the album is good enough, but it could have been better than that with a little further care and development."

Track listing

Charts

References

External links
 

2007 albums
Luke Vibert albums
Planet Mu albums
Acid techno albums
Experimental techno albums